The 2013 FIBA Africa Under-16 Championship for Men (alternatively the Afrobasket U16) was the 3rd U-16 FIBA Africa championship, organized by FIBA Africa and played under the auspices of the Fédération Internationale de Basketball, the basketball sport governing body and qualified for the 2014 FIBA Under-17 World Championship. The tournament was held from June 28 to July 7 in Antananarivo, Madagascar, contested by 9 national teams and won by Angola.

Squads

Format
The 9 teams were divided into two groups (Groups A+B) for the preliminary round.
Round robin for the preliminary round; the top four teams advanced to the quarterfinals.
From there on a knockout system was used until the final.

Draw

Preliminary round
Times given below are in UTC+3.

Group A

Group B

Knockout stage 
All matches were played in: Palais des Sports, Antananarivo

5th place bracket

Quarterfinals

Classification 5–8

Semifinals

Seventh place game

Fifth place game

Bronze medal game

Gold medal game

Final standings

Angola rosterAires Goubel, Alexandre Jungo, Avelino Dó, Bruno Santos, Cley Cabanga, Cristiano Xavier, Daniel Manuel, Edmilson Miranda, Eric Amândio, Mílton Valente, Sílvio Sousa, Teodoro Hilário, Coach: Manuel Silva (Gi)

Awards

All-Tournament Team
 Mohamed Abdelmaguid
 Mohamed Abdelrahman MVP
 Achref Gannouni
 Sílvio Sousa
 Shekinah Munanga

Statistical Leaders

Individual Tournament Highs

Points

Rebounds

Assists

Steals

Blocks

Minutes

Individual Game Highs

Team Tournament Highs

Points per Game

Total Points

Rebounds

Assists

Steals

Blocks

2-point field goal percentage

3-point field goal percentage

Free throw percentage

Team Game highs

See also
 2014 FIBA Africa Under-18 Championship

External links
Official Website

2013
Under-16 Championship
FIBA Africa Under-16 Championship
International basketball competitions hosted by Madagascar